The 1962 Baltimore Colts season was the tenth for the team in the National Football League. They finished the   season with a record of 7 wins and 7 losses, in fourth place in the Western Conference, six games behind the Green Bay Packers.

The Colts lost twice each to Green Bay, Detroit, and Chicago.

Roster

Regular season

Schedule

Standings

See also 
History of the Indianapolis Colts
Indianapolis Colts seasons
Colts–Patriots rivalry

Baltimore Colts
1962
Baltimore Colts